Sore Thumb is a notable rock spire (about 1,400 m) which rises 50 m above a crest of Elkhorn Ridge, to the east of Topside Glacier, in Convoy Range, Victoria Land. Though not the highest point on the ridge, the spire stands out "like a sore thumb" and is an excellent reference point. The approved name is a shortened form of "Sore Thumb Stack," which had been suggested by New Zealand geologist Christopher J. Burgess during a visit to the area in the 1976–77 season.

Rock formations of Victoria Land
Scott Coast